Curling clubs in the Canadian province of Ontario are organized into the Ontario Curling Association in southern Ontario and the Northern Ontario Curling Association in Northern Ontario.

Ontario Curling Association clubs
The OCA divides its clubs into 16 geographical regions:

Zone 1

Zone 2

Zone 3

Zone 4

Zone 5

Zone 6

Zone 7

* Club plays at the Leaside Curling Club

Zone 8
 

* Club plays at the St. George's Golf & Country Club

Zone 9

Zone 10

Zone 11
Allenford Curling Club - Allenford
Blue Water Curling Club - Owen Sound 
Chesley Curling Club - Chesley
Curling Club of Collingwood - Collingwood
Grey Granite Club - Owen Sound
Markdale Golf and Curling Club - Markdale
Meaford Curling Club - Meaford
Paisley Curling Club - Paisley
Port Elgin Curling Club - Port Elgin
Southampton Curling Club - Southampton
Tara Curling Club - Tara
Wiarton Curling Club - Wiarton

Zone 12
Arthur & Area Curling Club - Arthur
Ayr Curling Club - Ayr
Elmira & District Curling Club - Elmira
Elora Curling Club - Elora
Fergus Curling Club - Fergus 
Galt Country Club - Cambridge
Galt Curling Club - Cambridge
Guelph Country Club - Guelph
Guelph Curling Club - Guelph  
Kitchener-Waterloo Granite Club - Waterloo
Plattsville Curling Club - Plattsville
Westmount Golf & Country Club - Kitchener

Zone 13
Burlington Curling Club - Burlington
Burlington Golf & Country Club - Burlington
Dundas Granite Curling Club - Dundas 
Dundas Valley Golf & Curling Club - Dundas
Glanford Curling Club - Mount Hope 
Glendale Golf & Country Club - Hamilton 
Grimsby Curling Club - Grimsby
Hamilton Victoria Club - Hamilton
Niagara Falls Curling Club - Niagara Falls
St. Catharines Curling Club - St. Catharines
St. Catharines Golf & Country Club - St. Catharines
Welland Curling Club - Welland

Zone 14
Durham Curling Club - Durham
Exeter Curling Club - Exeter
Hanover Curling Club - Hanover
Harriston Curling Club - Harriston
Kincardine Curling Club - Kincardine
Listowel Curling Club - Listowel
Maitland Country Club - Goderich
Mount Forest Curling Club - Mount Forest
Palmerston Curling Club - Palmerston
Ripley Curling Club - Ripley
Seaforth Curling Club - Seaforth
Teeswater Curling Club - Teeswater
Vanastra Curling Club - Clinton 
Walkerton Golf & Curling Club - Walkerton
Wingham Golf & Curling Club - Wingham

Zone 15
Aylmer Curling Club - Aylmer
Brant Curling Club - Brantford 
Brantford Golf & Country Club - Brantford
Ingersoll & District Curling Club - Ingersoll
Norwich District Curling Club - Norwich
Paris Curling Club - Paris
Simcoe Curling Club - Simcoe
St. Marys Curling Club - St. Marys
St. Thomas Curling Club - St. Thomas
Stratford Country Club - Stratford
Tavistock Curling Club - Tavistock
Tillsonburg & District Curling Club - Tillsonburg
Woodstock Curling Club - Woodstock

Zone 16

Northern Ontario Curling Association

Region 1
Red Lake District Curling Club - Balmertown 
Kenora Curling Club - Kenora
Atikokan Curling Club - Atikokan
Ojiway Curling Club - Sioux Lookout 
Fort Frances Curling Club - Fort Frances
Eagles' Landing Golf & Curling Club - Dryden
Keewatin Curling Club - Keewatin 
Rainy River Curling Club - Rainy River 
Red Lake District Curling Club - Red Lake

Region 2
Fort William Curling Club - Thunder Bay
Port Arthur Curling Club - Thunder Bay
Thunder Bay Curling Club - Thunder Bay
Kakabeka Falls Curling Club - Kakabeka Falls

Region 3
C & D Paul Curling Club - Hornepayne
Nipigon Curling Club - Nipigon
Red Rock Curling Club - Red Rock
Marathon Curling Club - Marathon
Terrace Bay Curling Club - Terrace Bay
White River Curling Club - White River 
Manitouwadge Curling Club - Manitouwadge
Geraldton Curling Club - Geraldton
Longlac Curling Club - Longlac

Region 4
Deer Trail Curling Club - Elliot Lake
Espanola Curling Club - Espanola
Gore Bay Curling Club - Gore Bay
Little Current Curling Club - Little Current
Assiginack Curling Club - Manitowaning 
Mindemoya Curling Club - Mindemoya
Providence Bay Curling Club - Mindemoya
Blind River Curling Club - Blind River
Soo Curlers Association - Sault Ste. Marie
Tarentorus Curling Club - Sault Ste. Marie
Thessalon Curling Club - Thessalon
Wawa Curling Club - Wawa

Region 5
22nd Wing Curling Club - North Bay
North Bay Granite Club - North Bay
Sturgeon Falls Curling Club - Sturgeon Falls
Mattawa Curling Club - Mattawa
Nosbonsing Curling Club - Astorville
Powassan Curling Club - Powassan
South River Curling Club - South River
Capreol Curling Club - Capreol
Coniston Curling Club - Coniston
Copper Cliff Curling Club - Copper Cliff
Falconbridge Curling Club - Falconbridge
Idylwylde Golf & Country Club - Sudbury
Onaping Curling Club - Levack
Sudbury Curling Club - Sudbury

Region 6
Cobalt-Haileybury Curling Club - Haileybury
Cochrane Curling Club - Cochrane 
Englehart Curling Club - Englehart
Hearst Curling Club - Hearst
Horne Granite Curling Club - New Liskeard
Iroquois Falls Curling Club - Iroquois Falls
Kapuskasing Curling Club - Kapuskasing
Kirkland Lake Curling Club - Kirkland Lake
McIntyre Curling Club - Schumacher
Smooth Rock Falls Curling Club - Smooth Rock Falls
Stratton Curling Club - Stratton

 Ontario
Curling
Curling clubs
 
Curling in Ontario
Ontario